Anthony Tucker, better known as The Beat Bully or Tone Beats, is an American record producer and songwriter from Chester, Pennsylvania. His older brother Orlando Tucker, is also a notable record producer under the name, Jahlil Beats. He is also a member of the production team Da Night Rydas. The Beat Bully has produced for rappers such as Meek Mill, French Montana, Rick Ross, DJ Khaled, Bow Wow, and The Game among others. He is best known for producing Rick Ross' "Stay Schemin'" and Meek Mill's "House Party".

Musical career 
The Beat Bully first begun producing at the age of 13, along with his brother Jahlil Beats. He originally went by the production alias Tone Beats, but he changed it to The Beat Bully. He told XXL, "people used to just say I bullied the beats, so I put Beat Bully together." The Beat Bully begun taking production seriously in 2009, and he was then connected with rapper Meek Mill through Jahlil Beats. He then produced "I Want It All", a Lou Williams and Meek Mill song that was his first professionally recorded song. Then the second song he produced for Mill would be "House Party" "House Party" would peak at number 45 on the US Billboard Hot R&B/Hip-Hop Songs chart. He would end up producing three tracks on Meek Mill's breakout mixtape Dreamchasers. Shortly after he formed the production team Da Night Rydas with Kenoe, The Beat Bully, Snizzy, and Crack Coke. The team has since produced for 2 Chainz, T.I., Nicki Minaj and Lil Wayne.

His second major production placement would be on Rick Ross' "Stay Schemin'", which features French Montana and Drake. He originally gave the beat to Bow Wow, but The Beat Bully would then pass it on to Rick Ross. In early 2012, The Beat Bully begun being managed by Young Money Entertainment president Mack Maine. On July 11, 2012, Birdman announced that he had signed The Beat Bully to Cash Money Records as a producer. Over 2012, The Beat Bully produced Rick Ross' "So Sophisticated" the second single from God Forgives, I Don't, and contributed production to DJ Khaled's Kiss The Ring and Meek Mill's debut album Dreams & Nightmares. In 2013, The Beat Bully produced the promotional singles "Fuck What Happens Tonight" by French Montana and "I Feel Like Pac, I Feel Like Biggie" by DJ Khaled.

Production style 
The Beat Bully's production style has been described as "sample-free club meets trap" music.

Production discography

Singles produced

2011

Meek Mill - Dreamchasers 
09. "Middle Of Da Summer" (featuring Mel Love)
12. "I'm Me"

2012

Meek Mill - Dreamchasers 2 
01. "Intro"
17. "House Party" Remix (featuring Fabolous, Wale, Mac Miller)

The Game - California Republic 
01. "God Speed"
09. "Tonight"

Maybach Music Group - Self Made Vol. 2 
09. "M.I.A." (Omarion featuring Wale)

DJ Khaled - Kiss The Ring 
08. "I Did It For My Dawgz" (featuring Rick Ross, Meek Mill, French Montana, Jadakiss)

Meek Mill - Dreams & Nightmares 
01. "Dreams & Nightmares"

2013

Bow Wow - Greenlight 5 
05. "Eat The Cake" (featuring Lil Wayne)
11. "I Try"

French Montana - Excuse My French 
06. "Fuck What Happens Tonight" (featuring DJ Khaled, Mavado, Ace Hood, Snoop Dogg and Scarface)

Meek Mill - Dreamchasers 3 
08. "Hip Hop"
11. "Heaven or Hell" (featuring Jadakiss and Guordan Banks)

DJ Khaled - Suffering from Success 
03. "I Feel Like Pac/I Feel Like Biggie" (featuring Diddy, Meek Mill, T.I., Swizz Beatz and Rick Ross)

Ace Hood - Starvation 2 
08. "Want 4 Nothing"

2014

Ace Hood - Starvation III 
04.  "Jamaica"

Wiz Khalifa - Blacc Hollywood 
16. "On Me" (featuring Jeezy)

T.I. - Paperwork 
08. "Jet Fuel" (featuring Boosie Badazz) (co-produced with Kenoe)

2015

DJ Khaled - I Changed a Lot 
01. "I Don't Play About My Paper" (featuring Future and Rick Ross)
09. "I Ain't Worried" (featuring Ace Hood and Rick Ross)

2016

Drake - "Views"
05. "Hype" (produced with Boi-1da & Nineteen85)
DJ Khaled - Major Key
 06. "Ima Be Alright" (featuring Bryson Tiller and Future)

References 

Living people
Year of birth missing (living people)
African-American record producers
American hip hop record producers
East Coast hip hop musicians
Musicians from Pennsylvania
People from Chester, Pennsylvania
21st-century African-American people